Myint Swe  (born 24 May 1951) is a Burmese politician and retired army general currently serving as Acting President of Myanmar as well as First Vice President. He previously served as the acting president after the resignation of President Htin Kyaw on 21 March 2018, and the chief minister of Yangon Region from 30 March 2011 to 30 March 2016. On 30 March 2016, he was sworn in as the vice president of Myanmar. A member of the military proxy Union Solidarity and Development Party, he is an ethnic Mon former lieutenant general in the Myanmar Army.

Myint Swe was declared acting president by the Tatmadaw (military) in the coup d'état on 1 February 2021, after which he immediately formally transferred power to coup leader Min Aung Hlaing. Throughout his political career, Myint Swe has worked to ensure the Tatmadaw's influence in politics. He has rarely been seen in public since the coup, with Min Aung Hlaing serving as the face of the government. Myint Swe's main role in the military government has been to formally grant and renew Min Aung Hlaing's emergency powers.

Military career
He graduated from the Defence Services Academy in 1971 as part of the 15th intake. He became a brigadier general and commander of Light Infantry Division 11 in 1997. He was appointed as Commander of Southeastern Command and member of State Peace and Development Council in 2001. He was transferred as Commander of Yangon Command and promoted to major general. He also acted as Chairman of Yangon Division Peace and Development Council.

He became the Chief of Military Security Affairs after Khin Nyunt was purged in 2004. He became Chief of Bureau of Special Operations – 5 (BSO-5) in January 2006. He is the first ethnic Mon to be promoted to the rank of Lieutenant General in 2005. He was promoted to Quartermaster General and was rumored to be the next in line to replace Maung Aye in 2009.

He executed 3 major events while he was commanding the Yangon Command, arresting family members of Ne Win in 2002 after an alleged coup conspiracy was uncovered, arresting Khin Nyunt and his associates in 2004 in the purge of the Military Intelligence faction and crushing the Saffron Revolution in 2007. His actions after Cyclone Nargis was criticized. He dealt with activists harshly in the pre-2010 general election period.

Political career

Chief Minister of Yangon Region
He was nominated as chief-minister of the Yangon Region after the general election by President Thein Sein. He was tipped to be nominated to become Vice President of Burma after Tin Aung Myint Oo's resignation in 2012, but did not qualify per the Constitution of Burma, as his son-in-law was an Australian citizen at the time.

Vice Presidency
On 11 March 2016, military-appointed MPs of the Assembly of the Union nominated him as one of the Vice Presidents of Myanmar. He received 213 votes on 15 March 2016 and became First Vice President of Htin Kyaw's Cabinet. He was sworn in on 30 March 2016.

Acting President
On 21 March 2018, following the sudden resignation of Htin Kyaw as President of Myanmar, Myint Swe was sworn in as acting president under the Constitution of Myanmar, which also called for the Assembly to select a new president within seven days of Htin Kyaw's resignation.

On 1 February 2021, President Win Myint was illegally removed from office and detained by the Tatmadaw (military), so Myint Swe would become Acting President, allowing him to call a meeting of the military-controlled National Defence and Security Council so a state of emergency could be invoked and power could be formally transferred to coup leader Commander-in-Chief of Defence Services Min Aung Hlaing, which Myint Swe did the same day. The military maintains that Myint Swe constitutionally assumed the presidency because the constitution states the first vice president becomes acting president if the presidency becomes vacant "for any reason". However this interpretation is incorrect as the military had no legal authority to detain Win Myint and the constitution provides for an impeachment and removal process which was not followed. Additionally, Myint Swe’s declaration of a state of emergency was also unconstitutional because the full NDSC was not consulted; the military had illegally detained other members of the council, including de facto government leader Aung San Suu Kyi (a member of the NDSC as Minister of Foreign Affairs), prior to the meeting being called.

Myint Swe has extended the state of emergency three times by six month periods at meetings of the National Defence and Security Council, but has not otherwise participated in government. The third extension was especially controversial because the constitution says up to two extensions are "normally" allowed. Myint Swe acknowledged this but justified the extension due to what he said are "unusual circumstances" (namely, the civil war started by the military’s seizure of power). The junta-packed Constitutional Tribunal affirmed his interpretation.

Personal life
Myint Swe is of Mon descent. He is married to Khin Thet Htay, and has two children, including Khin Thet Htar Swe.

References

|-

1951 births
Burmese generals
Burmese people of Mon descent
Defence Services Academy alumni
Living people
Vice-presidents of Myanmar
Leaders who took power by coup
Union Solidarity and Development Party politicians
People from Mandalay
Acting presidents of Myanmar
21st-century Burmese politicians
Specially Designated Nationals and Blocked Persons List
Individuals related to Myanmar sanctions
Military dictatorship in Myanmar